AT-rich interactive domain-containing protein 5B is a protein that in humans is encoded by the ARID5B gene.

Alternative names for this gene include Modulator recognition factor 23.

Genomics

The gene is located on the long arm of chromosome 10 (10q21.2) on the 'plus' strand. It spans 195,261 base pairs in length. It encodes a protein of predicted length and molecular weight of 1188 amino acids and 132.375 kilo Daltons respectively.

Clinical importance

Through genome wide association studies (GWAS),some of the single nucleotide polymorphisms (SNPs) located in this gene has been noticed to be significantly associated with susceptibility 
as well as treatment outcomes  of childhood acute lymphoblastic leukaemia in ethnically diverse populations.

References

External links

Further reading